The 1974 Campeonato Argentino de Rugby  was won by the selection of Buenos Aires that beat in the final the selection of  Cuyo

That year in Argentina rugby union  

 In 1974, was the France selection to visit Argentina, obtaining two difficult victories against "pumas" 

 The selection of Buones Aires wan also the "Campeonato Juvenil" (under-19)
 The Buenos Aires Championship was won by C.A.S.I.
 The Cordoba Province Championship was won by Córdoba Athletic
 The North-East Championship was won by Universitario Tucumán

Preliminaries
Four zonal group to qualify for final four
 Mar del Plata admitted directly as host.
 The winner of Zone 1 and 2 admitted to final four
 The winner of Zone 3 and 4 to an interzone barrage

Zone 1

Zone 2

Zone 3

Zone 4

Interzone 3-4

Semifinals

Buenos Aires M. Alonso.,  M. Walther,  A. Rodríguez jurado,  R. Matarazzo,  F. Villamil,  H. Porta,  M. Cutler;,  J. Carracedo,  R. Sanz,  M. Iglesias (cap);   C. Bottarini,  J. Rodríguez Jurado; O. Carbone,  F. Lafuente,  M. Carluccio; 
Cordoba: M. Bernis Salles,  D. Ciclic,  H. Aguad,  M. Capelli,  R. Rotondo,  G. Bergallo,  J. Peralta,  R. Byleveld (cap.),  L. Domínguez,  E. Cosimi,  G. Jáuregui,  D. Borcoch,  H. Zinni,  H. Bianchi,  H. Méndez; 

Mar del Plata: J. Viders,  D. Filippa,  R. L'Erario,  C. Sosa,  M. Petita,  L. Pierangeli,  R. Capparelli,  M. Miguens,  M. Riego,  R. Panzarini,  W. Heath (cap),  M. Buenaventura,  R. Sepe,  N. Borro,  R. Bonomi, 
Cuyo:' O. Orlandi,  M. Brandi,  D. Muñiz,  O. Terranova,  C. Dora,  C. Navessi (cap.),  L. Chacón,  J. Naves,  D. García,  J. Nassazzi,  R. Irañeta,  A. Cattáneo,  C. Cruz,  J. Crivelli,  R.. Fariello

Final

Buenos Aires: M. Alonso,  J. Otaola,  A. Rodríguez Jurado,  M. Walther,  F. Villamil, H. Porta,  A. Etchegaray,  J. Carracedo,  R. Sáenz,  DI. Iglesias (cap.),  C. Bottarini,  J. Rodríguez Jurado,  O. Carbone,  R. Rocha,  F. Insúa 
Cuyo:' O. Orlandi,  C. Dora,  D. Muñiz,  O. Terranova,  R. Tarquini,  C. Navessi (cap),  L. Chacón,  R. Ituarte,  J. Nassazzi,  J. Navessi,  C. Cattáneo,  R. Irañeta,  C. Cruz,  J. Crivelli,  R. Fariello

Bibliography 
  Memorias de la UAR 1974
  XXX Campeonato Argentino

Campeonato Argentino de Rugby
Argentina
Campeonato